Lightseeker is the second album from the Romanian power metal band Magica. It was released in 2004. A music video was made for the song "Bittersweet Nightshade".

Track listing 
 "The Circle" - 1:36
 "Bind You Forever" - 4:47
 "Bittersweet Nightshade" - 4:11
 "Dance of the Wasp" - 4:24
 "A New Paradise" - 3:20
 "Samhain" - 3:37
 "Witch's Broom" - 4:09
 "The Living Grimoire" - 5:56
 "Black Lace" - 4:30
 "Curse for Eternity" - 5:01
 "Wormwood" - 5:04
 "Inluminata" - 4:18

External links 
 Lightseeker at Spirit of Metal webzine
 Divenia Records

Magica (band) albums
2004 albums